Radoš Bajić (born 24 September 1953) is a Serbian actor and scenarist. He appeared in more than fifty films since 1975. 
The scenarist is a series of Selo gori, a baba se češlja (English: The village is burning, and the grandmother is combing her hair), the most watched series in Serbian history.

Selected filmography

References

External links
 

1953 births
Living people
People from Trstenik, Serbia
Serbian male film actors
Serbian male television actors
20th-century Serbian male actors